Lambaesia is a genus of snout moths described by Hans Rebel in 1903. Its single species,  Lambaesia caradjae, was described by the same author in the same year. It is found in Algeria.

References

Phycitinae
Endemic fauna of Algeria
Monotypic moth genera
Moths of Africa